ISLES (Irish–Scottish Links on Energy Study) was a project that ran from 2010–2015. Its purpose was to facilitate the development of offshore renewable resources, such as wind, wave and tidal energy, and renewable energy trade between Scotland, Republic of Ireland and Northern Ireland. It assessed the feasibility, and developed a conception, of creating an integrated offshore transmission network connecting renewable energy project sites located off the west coast of Scotland, north and east coasts of Northern Ireland, west coast of Ireland and in the Irish Sea with onshore grids.  It was a joint project  between the governments of Scotland, Ireland and Northern Ireland, funded primarily by the European Union's INTERREG IVA Programme. Funding from INTERREG was approximately €2 million.

The ISLES project was announced by Minister for Enterprise, Energy and Tourism of Scotland Jim Mather and Minister for Communications, Energy and Natural Resources of Ireland Eamon Ryan in Glasgow on 7 June 2008. The project was managed by the Special EU Programmes Body. The contract to undertake the feasibility study was awarded to a consortium led by RPS Group. Its final reports were delivered to the inter-governmental steering group in late-2011. The findings were disseminated at a conference in Glasgow on 23 November 2011.  According to these findings, there are no technological barriers to ISLES and the project is feasible, although landfall points throughout the three jurisdictions have significant constraints due to environmental issues. It would cost about £1 million per each MW of installed capacity.

See also

North Sea Offshore Grid

References

External links
 

Electricity policy in Scotland
Electric power infrastructure in Scotland
Electric power infrastructure in Ireland
Politics of the British Isles